Clintonia Township is one of thirteen townships in DeWitt County, Illinois, USA.  As of the 2010 census, its population was 7,832 and it contained 3,628 housing units.  Clintonia Township changed its name from Clinton Township June 7, 1859.

Geography

Cities, towns, villages
 Clinton (all but south edge)

Cemeteries
The township contains these four cemeteries: Memorial Park, Oak Park, Weaver and Woodlawn.

Major highways
  U.S. Route 51
  Illinois Route 10
  Illinois Route 54

School districts
 Clinton Community Unit School District 15

Political districts
 United States Congressional District 15
 State House District 101
 State Senate District 51

References
 
 United States Census Bureau 2009 TIGER/Line Shapefiles
 United States National Atlas

External links
 City-Data.com
 Illinois State Archives
 Township Officials of Illinois

Townships in DeWitt County, Illinois
1858 establishments in Illinois
Populated places established in 1858
Townships in Illinois